Danny Sveinson (born 4 May 1991 in Mount Barker, South Australia), is a Canadian guitarist. He was the subject of the 2006 CBC documentary entitled "The Rock and Roll Kid".

Biography
He was touted as a guitar prodigy at a young age, performing as the closing act for the Telus World Ski and Snowboarding Festival. He played at the Commodore Ballroom in Vancouver, where he opened for Colin James. He has also made appearances on Breakfast Television, Urban Rush, The Vicky Gabereau Show, The Mike Bullard Show, as well as on MTV and YTV. He released his debut album in early 2004.

Danny was the subject of the front cover and feature story in the 25 November 2004 issue of The Georgia Straight, a weekly entertainment paper in Vancouver, in which he was proclaimed to be "A Guitar God in Training".  Danny began performing when he was 10 as "The Rock and Roll Kid".

The Rock and Roll Kid premiered to three sell-out audiences at the Vancouver International Film Festival in September 2006.  It won the "best documentary" award at the Leo Awards.

He formed Sonic City in 2005 and they toured in Canada twice, opening for Jeff Martin, The Trews and April Wine.  He later formed the rock group Mad Shadow, which has been said to sound like Led Zeppelin. In 2013 they released the album Heavy Blues.

References

External links
 CBC - The Rock and Roll Kid
 The Georgia Straight - Kid Rocks!
 Mad Shadow page
 Sonic City website

1991 births
Living people
21st-century Canadian guitarists